Nurses on the Line: The Crash of Flight 7 (also known as Lost in the Wild) is a 1993 American made-for-television drama film starring Lindsay Wagner and Robert Loggia. It was aired on CBS on November 23, 1993. It is set in Catemaco, Veracruz, Mexico.

Plot
A couple of student nurses decide to join some doctors to work in a medical station in the rain-forest a few hours flying-time from the Mexican town Catemaco. As they fly from Catemaco towards the clinic (which actually consists of just a few huts and almost no equipment) one of their three planes goes down because of engine malfunction. It crashes somewhere in the middle of the jungle causing bad injuries to the passengers. The following day describes the attempts by the passengers to save their own lives in spite of the few poor chances they seem to have. There is almost no medicine available, the supplies they brought with them were all on the plane going down and were stolen by native drug-dealers when they arrived at the site of the crash first. In the afternoon they decide to take the injured to a nearby village with a runway long enough that the Learjet of the Californian Air Rescue team could take them to a clinic in the U.S. Not only is the journey there very complicated (one of the injured could pass away any minute) but it may also be futile: due to recent anti-drug operations no plane is allowed to fly after dark, so the Air Rescue Team is not able to get clearance for their mission. Dr. Daniel Perrin sets off to Catamaco to persuade the authorities into giving their permission for the flight while the rest is trying to get to the runway by dawn.

Cast
 Lindsay Wagner — Elizabeth Hahn
 Robert Loggia — Dr. Daniel Perrin
 Jennifer Lopez — Rosie Romero
 David Clennon — Dr. Rulon Beesley
 Farrah Forke — Fran Markoe
 Paula Marshall — Jill Houston
 Hilary Edson — Danae Hahn
 Tom Irwin — Eddie
 Joan McMurtrey — LiAnne
 Sergio Calderón — José
 Gary Frank — Len
 Bill Bolender — Chris O'Neill
 David Villalpando — Luis

External links
 

1993 television films
1993 drama films
1993 films
CBS network films
Films set in Mexico
Los Tuxtlas
American aviation films
American drama television films
1990s English-language films
Films directed by Larry Shaw
1990s American films